Canadian federal elections have provided the following results in Eastern Montreal.

Regional Profile
The eastern end of the Island of Montreal was the birthplace of the sovereigntist movement, and remained a sovereigntist stronghold for four decades. During this time, whenever the Parti Québécois won provincially, the entire eastern half of the island was coated light blue. Federally, it was the Bloc Québécois's power base from 1993 to 2011, partly due to its leftist bent. With the exception of ethnic areas that protrude from Northern Montreal into the East Island's Honoré-Mercier riding, where Liberal support is strong, the area is relatively homogeneously Francophone and lower-income, a recipe for Bloc dominance. Prior to the rise of the Bloc, the region voted solidly Liberal for decades before being swept up in the Brian Mulroney tide, electing Quebec nationalists under the Progressive Conservative banner.  The Conservative Party of Canada has never approached this level of support, and eastern Montreal is currently the weakest region in Canada for the Tories. In 2011, the federalist NDP swept every seat in this region amid the surge of popular support in the province and the concurrent Bloc meltdown, in all but one case by well over 6,000 votes.  The NDP surge even cost longtime Bloc leader Gilles Duceppe his seat in Laurier-Sainte-Marie.

The NDP largely held its gains in 2015, losing Honoré-Mercier to the Liberals and La Pointe-de-l'Île—long reckoned as the most strongly sovereigntist riding in Quebec—to the Bloc.  However, Duceppe came up well short in his bid to retake his old riding. In 2019, however, the NDP was cut down to just one riding in eastern Montreal, with the Bloc holding onto La Pointe-de-l'Île and the Liberals taking the other three.

Votes by party throughout time

1984 - 33rd General Election

Seats won/lost by party

Results by riding

Notes

References

Montreal, E
Politics of Montreal